Antony Leslie 'Tony' Vogel (29 June 1942 – 27 July 2015) was an English actor. He played Andrew in the mini-series of Franco Zeffirelli's Jesus of Nazareth (1977), Aquila in A.D. Anno Domini (1985) 
and the title role in the 1979 television adaptation of Dick Barton.

He graduated from RADA in 1963 and died of asthma complications at his Normandy holiday home in France on 27 July 2015. The actor was 73 and was cremated.

TV and filmography

References

External links
 

1942 births
2015 deaths
Alumni of RADA
English male film actors
English male television actors